Gardiner Hannah (4 February 1871 – after 1898) was a Scottish footballer who made 59 appearances in the Football League playing for Blackburn Rovers and Lincoln City. He played as a right half. Before moving to England, he played for his local team, Baillieston Thistle, and for Airdrieonians.

References

1871 births
Year of death missing
People from Baillieston
Footballers from Glasgow
Scottish footballers
Association football wing halves
Airdrieonians F.C. (1878) players
Blackburn Rovers F.C. players
Lincoln City F.C. players
English Football League players
Place of death missing